Cannon Trading Company, Inc. is a licensed future, commodities, and Forex Brokerage firm. It is an independent Introducing Broker based in Los Angeles, California. It was incorporated and has been a member of the National Futures Association  the futures industry’s self-regulatory body – since 1988. Cannon Trading Company is also registered with the Commodity Futures Trading Commission and is a member of the Beverly Hills Chamber of Commerce and the U.S Chamber of Commerce.

History

Cannon Trading Company, Inc. Company was founded in 1988 by Mike Levy. and Sara Wintner. It was one of the early commodities brokerage firms to offer online futures trading. It is an independent, introducing broker providing online, full-service, and managed futures trading services. Located in Los Angeles, California, Cannon Trading Company, Inc. offers 6 trading platforms, broker-assisted services with experienced licensed series 3 brokers, hedge accounts, trading systems as well as managed accounts. It offers a wide variety of services from the self-directed retail client to institutional and professional clients.

On December 11, 1995, founder Meir Levy purchased financial domain names such as CannonTrading.com.
In 1998, Ilan Levy-Mayer joined Cannon Trading and started its online division. Cannon Trading Company, Inc. became one of the first to offer online futures trading.
In 1999, Meir Levy, Chairman of the Board, emphasized the corporation's presence on the Internet as a key to the marketing and business development strategies of the company. 
 2000 – Continued corporation’s international presence to capture more foreign accounts and market share.
 2002 – Cannon Trading Company, Inc. decided to add FCMs as diversification of trading programs and online trading platforms to give its business an edge providing the best available programs.
 2002 Cannon Trading Company, Inc. reached a decision to further emphasize self-directed online trading through the online order entry systems, and add new online platforms from the following various reputable FCMs.
 2011 – Continue to stress the Corporations International presence through launching a redesign of CCannon Trading Company, Inc.’s website and technological database.
 2013 - Cannon Trading Company, Inc. offers 90% of available online platforms available.
In 2013, Cannon Trading Company, Inc. celebrated 25 years of futures trading services.
In 2013, Cannon Trading Company, Inc., written daily by Ilan Levy-Mayer, was voted #1 blog 2013 by Trader Planet.
 July 8, 2014, Cannon Trading Company, Inc. Releases New Futures Trading Platform, Shogun Trade Executor.
 2014 Cannon Trading Company, Inc. offers a complete range of futures trading services from online trading, systems trading, hedging services, and managed accounts.

Operations

Cannon Trading Company, Inc. is a US-based firm but has serviced customers from other countries worldwide. It offers a variety of on-line trading platforms – most of which serve the global market, broker-assist programs, and managed account opportunities. Cannon Trading Company, Inc.’s Founder, Principal, and President is Meir “Mike” Levy and its Vice President is Ilan Levy Mayer.

References

External links
 

Futures exchanges
Companies based in Los Angeles
1988 establishments in California